Wilbert Vere Awdry  (15 June 1911 – 21 March 1997) was an English Anglican minister, railway enthusiast, and children's author.  He was best known as the creator of Thomas the Tank Engine and several other characters who appeared in his Railway Series.

Life and career
Wilbert Awdry was born at Ampfield vicarage near Romsey, Hampshire, on 15 June 1911. His father was Vere Awdry (1854–1928), the Anglican vicar of Ampfield (who was 56 years old at the time of his birth), and his mother was Lucy Awdry (née Bury; 1884–1965). Wilbert was derived from William and Herbert, names of his father's two brothers. His younger brother, George, was born on 10 August 1916 and died on 27 October 1994. All three of Awdry's older half-siblings from his father's first two marriages died young, the youngest being killed in World War I. At Ampfield as a toddler he saw his father construct a handmade ,  model railway. In 1917, the family moved to Box, in Wiltshire, moving again within Box in 1919 and in 1920, the third house being "Journey's End" (renamed from "Lorne Villa"), which remained the family home until August 1928.

A banking engine was kept there to assist freight trains up the hill. These trains usually ran at night, and the young Awdry could hear them from his bed, listening to the coded whistle signals between the train engine and the banker as well as the sharp bark from the locomotive exhausts as they fought their way up the incline. Awdry said, "There was no doubt in my mind that steam engines all had definite personalities. I would hear them snorting up the grade and little imagination was needed to hear in the puffings and pantings of the two engines the conversation they were having with one another." Here was the inspiration for the story of Edward helping Gordon's train up the hill, a story that Wilbert first told his son Christopher some 25 years later, and which appeared in the first of the Railway Series books.

Awdry was educated at Marlborough House School, Hawkhurst, Kent (1919–1924), Dauntsey's School, West Lavington, Wiltshire (1924–1929), St Peter's Hall, Oxford (BA, 1932), and Wycliffe Hall, Oxford, where he gained his diploma in theology in 1933. He taught for three years from 1933 to 1936 at St George's School, Jerusalem. He was ordained to the Church of England diaconate in 1936 and subsequently the priesthood. In 1938, he married Margaret Emily Wale (1912 – 21 March 1989). In 1940, he took a curacy at St Nicolas Church, Kings Norton, Birmingham, where he lived until 1946. He subsequently moved to Cambridgeshire, serving as rector of Elsworth with Knapwell (1946–1950), rural dean at Bourn (1950–1953) and then vicar of Emneth, Norfolk (1953–1965). He retired from full-time ministry in 1965 and moved to Rodborough in Stroud in Gloucestershire.

The characters that would make Awdry known and the first stories featuring them were invented in 1942 to amuse his son Christopher during a bout of measles. After Awdry wrote The Three Railway Engines, he built Christopher a model of Edward, and some wagons and coaches, out of a wooden broomstick and scraps of wood. Christopher also wanted a model of Gordon; however the wartime shortage of materials limited Awdry to making a little 0-6-0 tank engine. Awdry said, "The natural name was Thomas – Thomas the Tank Engine." Then Christopher requested stories about Thomas and these duly followed and were published in the book Thomas the Tank Engine, published in 1946.

The first book, The Three Railway Engines, was published in 1945. Awdry wrote 26 books in The Railway Series , the last in 1972. Christopher subsequently added further books to the series.

In 1947, 0-6-0T engine No. 1800 was built by Hudswell Clarke; it spent its working life at the Peterborough-based factory, a property of the British Sugar Corporation, pushing wagons of sugar beet until it was finally replaced by a diesel engine. Peterborough Railway Society purchased the engine in 1973, and this little blue 'Thomas' engine is the star of the Nene Valley Railway.

In 1952, Awdry volunteered as a guard on the Talyllyn Railway in Wales, then in its second year of preservation. The railway inspired Awdry to create the Skarloey Railway, based on the Talyllyn, with some of his exploits being written into the stories.

Awdry's enthusiasm for railways did not stop at his publications. He was involved in railway preservation, and built model railways, which he took to exhibitions around the country. At Emneth he created an extensive model railway network in his loft based on Barrow-in-Furness. Emneth was also close to three Wisbech railway stations. Emneth railway station was on the EAR line from Magdalen Road Station (now known as Watlington) to Wisbech East, Emneth station is now a private residence. The GER Wisbech and Upwell Tramway tram engines, coaches and rolling stock were similar to Toby the Tram Engine and Henrietta and the Ely to King's Lynn mainline with Wisbech East railway station on Victoria Road. The M&GN Peterborough to Sutton Bridge via Wisbech North railway station on Harecroft Road. There were also harbour lines either side of the Port of Wisbech on the River Nene - M&GN Harbour West branch and GER Harbour East branch. He was a passenger on Alan Pegler's 1968 non-stop Flying Scotsman London King's Cross to Edinburgh run.

Awdry wrote other books besides those of The Railway Series, both fiction and non-fiction. The story Belinda the Beetle was about a red car (it became a Volkswagen Beetle only in the illustrations to the paperback editions).

In 1988, his second Ffarquhar model railway layout was shown to the public for the final time and was featured on an ITN News news item. He was again featured on TV-am for Thomas's 40th anniversary in 1990. During all this, Awdry faced many battles – health problems, depression, and the death of his wife, brother and close friend Teddy Boston. Five years later, he was interviewed by Nicholas Jones for the Bookmark film The Thomas the Tank Engine Man, which first aired on 25 February 1995 and repeated again on 15 April 1997 shortly after his death.

Awdry was awarded an OBE in the 1996 New Year's Honours List, but by that time his health had deteriorated and he was unable to travel to London. He died peacefully in his sleep in Stroud, Gloucestershire, on 21 March 1997, at the age of 85. His ashes are interred at Gloucester Crematorium.

A biography entitled The Thomas the Tank Engine Man was written by Brian Sibley and published in 1995.

Memorials

A Class 91 locomotive, 91 124, used to bear the name The Rev W Awdry. A Hunslet Austerity 0-6-0ST (saddle tank) engine on the Dean Forest Railway is named Wilbert after him; and was used as the title character in Christopher Awdry's Railway Series book Wilbert the Forest Engine.

In 2003, a stained glass window commissioned by the Awdry family was unveiled at St. Edmund's church, Emneth, Norfolk.

In 2011, a blue plaque was unveiled by his daughter Veronica Chambers at The Old Vicarage, Emneth where he lived between 1953 and 1965. In 2012 a blue plaque was unveiled at "Lorne House", Box, where he lived between 1920 and 1928 when its name was "Journey's End".

In 2013, Cambridgeshire County Council named their new offices in Wisbech Awdry House in his memory.

In 2015, he was rendered in CGI for a special cameo in Sodor's Legend of the Lost Treasure, then later in 2016, he was rendered in CGI again as a cameo in The Great Race. He made frequent appearances ever since, occasionally interacting with the engines, and is referred to by his Railway Series alias, 'The Thin Clergyman'.

A pedestrian rail crossing bridge has been dedicated to Awdry in 2017 in the small Hampshire town of Chandlers Ford, which is very close (and has the closest railway line and station) to his birthplace of Ampfield.

In 2021, to mark the 75th anniversary of Thomas the Tank Engine, a blue plaque was unveiled at the old Rectory of Holy Trinity Church in Ellsworth, Cambridgeshire. Cambridge Past, Present & Future put up the  plaque to mark the books he wrote there. His daughter, Veronica Chambers, said she was "delighted and moved".

Letter to Christopher

In the second book in the series, Thomas the Tank Engine, Awdry wrote this "letter" to his son Christopher:
Dear Christopher,
Here is your friend Thomas, the Tank Engine.
He wanted to come out of his station-yard and see the world.
These stories tell you how he did it.
<p>I hope you will like them because you helped me to make them.
Your Loving Daddy

Subsequent books featured a similar letter from the author, addressed to the readers of the book as "Dear Friends", which introduced the background to the stories within the book.

This text also appears at the beginning of Thomas and Friends episodes from 2004 to 2012. The "letter" appears with a storybook showing Thomas on the front cover with "Thomas the Tank Engine" at the top and "By the Rev. W. Awdry" at the bottom. The book then opens up and we see the letter, read by British actor Nigel Plaskitt, and after the letter is finished a "steam" transition appears and it transitions to the Thomas & Friends theme song.

Publications
Fiction
 The Railway Series books
 The Three Railway Engines (1945)
 Thomas the Tank Engine (1946) 
 James the Red Engine (1948) 
 Tank Engine Thomas Again (1949) 
 Troublesome Engines (1950) 
 Henry the Green Engine (1951) 
 Toby the Tram Engine (1952) 
 Gordon the Big Engine (1953) 
 Edward the Blue Engine (1954) 
 Four Little Engines (1955) 
 Percy the Small Engine (1956) 
 The Eight Famous Engines (1957) 
 Duck and the Diesel Engine (1958) 
 The Little Old Engine (1959) 
 The Twin Engines (1960) ￼ 
 Branch Line Engines (1961) 
 Gallant Old Engine (1962) 
 Stepney the "Bluebell" Engine (1963) 
 Mountain Engines (1964) 
 Very Old Engines (1965) 
 Main Line Engines (1966) 
 Small Railway Engines (1967) 
 Enterprising Engines (1968) 
 Oliver the Western Engine (1969) 
 Duke the Lost Engine (1970) 
 Tramway Engines (1972) 
 Thomas's Christmas Party (1984) 
 Thomas Comes to Breakfast (1985) 
 Belinda the Beetle (1958) illustrated by Ionicus
 Belinda Beats the Band (1961) illustrated by John T. Kenney
 W V Awdry & G E V Awdry, The Island of Sodor: Its People, History and Railways, Kaye and Ward, 1986.

Non-fiction
 Our Child Begins to Pray (Edmund Ward, 1951)
 P J Long & W V Awdry, The Birmingham and Gloucester Railway, Alan Sutton Publishing, 1987.

References

Further reading
 Wilbert Vere Awdry from Dictionary of Literary Biography by M. Margaret Dahlberg, University of North Dakota. 2005–2006 Thomson Gale

External links

 Rev W Awdry's appearance on BBC Radio 4's Desert Island Discs, first broadcast on 16 October 1964
 Awdry Family website
  – contains some information not available on the later site
  – Formerly www.sodor.co.uk (Dead link discovered April 2010)
 Rev. W. V. Awdry – Biography at the official Awdry Family website
 The Narrow Gauge Railway Museum, Tywyn, Gwynedd, Wales – Home of the Rev. W. V. Awdry's study
 "Obituary: The Rev W. Awdry", from The Independent, written by Brian Sibley 
 "Priests and Prelates: The Daily Telegraph Clerical Obituaries" (Entry for Rev. W Awdry), by Trevor Beeson – Note: contains some factual errors.
 Daily Telegraph Obituary – on which "Priests and Prelates" is based; also contains errors
 David Self (1 February 2008). "What draws clerics to railways?". Church Times.

1911 births
1997 deaths
People educated at Dauntsey's School
People from Romsey
English children's writers
Alumni of St Peter's College, Oxford
Alumni of Wycliffe Hall, Oxford
The Railway Series
Talyllyn Railway
20th-century English Anglican priests
British people in rail transport
Officers of the Order of the British Empire
English Christian pacifists
Anglican pacifists
Burials in Gloucestershire
British people associated with Heritage Railways
People from Rodborough
Rail transport writers